Blaesoxiphella brevicornis is a species of true flies in the family Sarcophagidae.

Range
Mongolia.

References 

Sarcophagidae
Diptera of Europe
Diptera of Asia
Insects described in 1912
Monotypic Diptera genera